A God in Ruins may refer to:

 A God in Ruins (Atkinson novel), a 2015 novel by Kate Atkinson
 A God in Ruins (Uris novel), a 1999 novel by Leon Uris